Kazuhide Ishiyama or Song Il-soo (born December 23, 1950) is the former manager of the Doosan Bears of the KBO League.

References 
 Retire player information from the KBO League

Doosan Bears managers
Doosan Bears coaches
Samsung Lions players
Kintetsu Buffaloes players
Baseball managers
Japanese baseball players
KBO League catchers
Nippon Professional Baseball catchers
Baseball people from Kyoto Prefecture
Japanese people of Korean descent
Naturalized citizens of Japan
1950 births
Living people